Mady Delvaux-Stehres (born 11 October 1950) is a Luxembourg politician who served as a Member of the European Parliament from 2014 until 2019. She served as Minister of Transport from 1994 to 1999 and as Minister of Health, Social Security, Youth and Sport from 1989 to 1994.

Education and early career
Delvaux-Stehres studied classical literature in Paris and became a teacher at a lycée Michel Rodange in Luxembourg.

Political career
Delvaux-Stehres has been a member of the Luxembourg Socialist Workers' Party since 1974 and in 1987 became a member of the city council of Luxembourg. She gave up her teaching post in 1989 when she entered government as secretary of State for Health, Social Security, Youth, and Sport. She was Minister for Transport between 1994 and 1999, and from 2004 to 2013 Minister for Education. 

From 2014 Delvaux-Stehres served as a Member of the European Parliament. In addition to her committee assignments, Delvaux-Stehres was a member of the European Parliament's Advisory Committee on the Conduct of Members.

In 2017, Delvaux-Stehres proposed a robot tax as part of a draft bill imposing ethical standards for robots in the European Union. However, the European Parliament rejected this aspect when it voted on the law.

References

External links
Luxembourg government biography

|-

|-

1950 births
Living people
People from Luxembourg City
Ministers for Transport of Luxembourg
Ministers for Communications of Luxembourg
Women government ministers of Luxembourg
Members of the Chamber of Deputies (Luxembourg)
Members of the Chamber of Deputies (Luxembourg) from Centre
Councillors in Luxembourg City
Luxembourg Socialist Workers' Party politicians
21st-century women MEPs for Luxembourg
MEPs for Luxembourg 2014–2019